is a Japanese manga series written and illustrated by Masahiro Anbe. It has been serialized in Akita Shoten's shōnen manga magazine Weekly Shōnen Champion since September 2016.

Publication
Written and illustrated by Masahiro Anbe, Atsumare! Fushigi Kenkyū-bu started in Akita Shoten's shōnen manga magazine Weekly Shōnen Champion on September 29, 2016. Akita Shoten has collected its chapters into individual tankōbon volumes. The first volume was released on April 7, 2017. As of November 8, 2022, fifteen volumes have been released.

Volume list

References

External links
  
  

Akita Shoten manga
Comedy anime and manga
School life in anime and manga
Shōnen manga